Pierrefiche is a village and commune in the Lozère département in southern France.

Geography
The Chapeauroux forms most of the commune's western border, then flows northeastward through the commune.

See also
Communes of the Lozère department

References

Communes of Lozère